Sparviero (Italian: "Sparrowhawk") was an Italian aircraft carrier designed and built during World War II of the Regia Marina. She was originally the ocean liner  built in 1927 for Navigazione Generale Italiana, but was transferred to the new Italian Line after the merger of Navigazione Generale Italiana. The conversion was started in 1942 originally under the name Falco but was never completed, and the ship was never delivered to the Regia Marina. She began to be scrapped in 1946, a process completed by 1952.

Service History

As MS Augustus

MS Augustus and her sistership, were a group combined ocean liner and cruise ship built in 1927 for Navigazione Generale Italiana. She was launched in December 1926 at the Ansaldo Shipyard and was christened by Edda Mussolini (daughter of dictator Benito Mussolini). The ship was later transferred to the new Italian Line after the merger of Navigazione Generale Italiana. When the war started in 1939, she and her sister ship, the Roma were laid up before Commissioned by the Royal Italian Navy (Regia Marina).

As Sparviero

In 1936, a project to transform the 30,418 GRT ocean liner Augustus into an auxiliary carrier was prepared. The idea was initially abandoned but then resumed in 1942.

The passenger ship Augustus was first renamed Falco in 1939 and then to Sparviero in 1940. The project resumed the one developed by the Colonel of the Naval Engineers Luigi Gagnotto and the transformation works began in September 1942 in the Ansaldo Shipyards in Genoa.

The superstructure was to be removed. She would have also been equipped with a single hangar with two lifts and fitted with a flight deck that ended  before the bow. The main armament would have been placed at the sides of the forecastle at the level of the hangar deck, and at the stern and there was no island structure because the exhaust gases of the diesel engines would have been expelled laterally below the level of the flight deck.

She would have had a narrow flight deck. Her air group was to be either 34 fighters or 16 fighters and 9 torpedo bombers. The propulsion plant was to remain unchanged, the diesel engines giving an estimated speed of under 20 knots.

The Sparviero was going to have an armament of six 152 mm guns and four of 102, as well as several anti-aircraft machine gun positions.

The conversion began in September 1942, the work undertaken by the Ansaldo Shipyard in Genoa. Apart from removing the superstructure little else was done before the Italian capitulation in September 1943. The hull was captured by the Germans and was sunk on 5 October 1944 to block access to the port of Genoa. The wreckage was recovered after the war and finally scrapped in 1951.

See also

Notes

Bibliography
 Pierluigi Malvezzi, Regia Marina Italiana: Italian Carriers – regiamarina.net

External links
 Aircraft carrier Aquila and Sparviero
 Portaerei Sparviero
 Sparviero Marina Militare website

Ships built in Genoa
1926 ships
Aircraft carriers of the Regia Marina
World War II aircraft carriers of Italy
Aircraft carriers of the Kriegsmarine
Naval ships of Italy captured by Germany during World War II
Ships built by Gio. Ansaldo & C.
Maritime incidents in October 1944
Proposed aircraft carriers